Fanco is an unincorporated community in Logan County, West Virginia, United States. It is part of the Amherstdale census-designated place.

References 

Unincorporated communities in West Virginia
Unincorporated communities in Logan County, West Virginia